The Martin County Fair is one of the largest agricultural fairs in the United States, occurring annually in February in Stuart, Florida. Established in 1960, this Fair is held at the Martin County Fairgrounds across from Witham Airfield. The fair includes rides and food, and features various local talents. 

Strict measures, such as social distancing & wearing masks, were undertaken in 2021, but have been suspended since 2022.

External links 
Martin County Fair.com

Tourist attractions in Martin County, Florida
February events
Fairs in the United States